Zach Joseph Mitchell is an English professional footballer who plays as a defender for League One club Charlton Athletic.

Career

Charlton Athletic
Coming through the youth system of Charlton Athletic, Mitchell penned his first professional contract with the club on 27 July 2022.

Mitchell made his professional debut for Charlton, playing the first 65 minutes of a 2–1 EFL Trophy victory at home against Brighton & Hove Albion U21 on 2 November 2022.

Mitchell made his second appearance for the club just four days later, on 5 November 2022, coming off the bench after just 18 minutes for the injured Terell Thomas, in the 4–1 FA Cup first round victory over Coalville Town.

Career statistics

References

External links
 

Living people
2005 births
English footballers
Charlton Athletic F.C. players
Association football forwards